Goodness gracious me is an interjection expressing surprise. It may also refer to:

"Goodness Gracious Me" (song), comic song recorded by Peter Sellers & Sophia Loren
Goodness Gracious Me (TV series), a British radio and then television sketch comedy series that was broadcast on BBC

Interjections
English phrases
fr:Delhi Royal